Just like Home is a 1978 Hungarian drama film directed by Márta Mészáros and starring Anna Karina.

Cast
 Zsuzsa Czinkóczi - Zsuzsi
 Jan Nowicki - Novák András
 Anna Karina - Anna
 Ildikó Pécsi - Zsuzsi anyja
 Kornélia Sallay - András anyja
 Ferenc Bencze - András apja
 Mária Dudás
 Éva Gyulányi
 Zsolt Horváth
 Éva Szabó - Éva
 László Szabó - Laci
 András Szigeti - Tsz-elnök
 Hédi Temessy - Klára asszony

References

External links
 

1978 films
1970s Hungarian-language films
1978 drama films
Films directed by Márta Mészáros
Hungarian drama films